The Z User Group (ZUG) was established in 1992 to promote use and development of the Z notation, a formal specification language for the description of and reasoning about computer-based systems. It was formally constituted on 14 December 1992 during the ZUM'92 Z User Meeting in London, England.

Meetings and conferences
ZUG has organised a series of Z User Meetings approximately every 18 months initially. From 2000, these became the ZB Conference (jointly with the B-Method, co-organized with APCB), and from 2008 the ABZ Conference (with Abstract State Machines as well). In 2010, the ABZ Conference also includes Alloy, a Z-like specification language with associated tool support.

The Z User Group participated at the FM'99 World Congress on Formal Methods in Toulouse, France, in 1999. The group and the associated Z notation have been studied as a Community of Practice.

List of proceedings
The following proceedings were produced by the Z User Group:

 Bowen, J.P.; Nicholls, J.E., eds. (1993). Z User Workshop, London 1992, Proceedings of the Seventh Annual Z User Meeting, 14–15 December 1992. Springer, Workshops in Computing. 
 Bowen, J.P.; Hall, J.A., eds. (1994). Z User Workshop, Cambridge 1994, Proceedings of the Eighth Annual Z User Meeting, 29–30 June 1994. Springer, Workshops in Computing. 
 Bowen, J.P.; Hinchey, M.G, eds. (1995). ZUM '95: The Z Formal Specification Notation, 9th International Conference of Z Users, Limerick, Ireland, September 7–9, 1995. Springer, Lecture Notes in Computer Science, Volume 967. 
 Bowen, J.P.; Hinchey, M.G.; Till, D., eds. (1997). ZUM '97: The Z Formal Specification Notation, 10th International Conference of Z Users, Reading, UK, April 3–4, 1997. Springer, Lecture Notes in Computer Science, Volume 1212. 
 Bowen, J.P.; Fett, A.; Hinchey, M.G., eds. (1998). ZUM '98: The Z Formal Specification Notation, 11th International Conference of Z Users, Berlin, Germany, September 24–26, 1998. Springer, Lecture Notes in Computer Science, Volume 1493. 

The following ZB conference proceedings were jointly produced with the Association de Pilotage des Conférences B (APCB), covering the Z notation and the related B-Method:

 Bowen, J.P.; Dunne, S.; Galloway, A.; King. S., eds. (2000). ZB 2000: Formal Specification and Development in Z and B, First International Conference of B and Z Users, York, UK, August 29 – September 2, 2000. Springer, Lecture Notes in Computer Science, Volume 1878. 
 Bert, D.; Bowen, J.P.; Henson, M.C.; Robinson, K., eds. (2002). ZB 2002: Formal Specification and Development in Z and B: 2nd International Conference of B and Z Users Grenoble, France, January 23–25, 2002. Springer, Lecture Notes in Computer Science, Volume 2272. 
 Bert, D.; Bowen, J.P.; King, S.; Walden, M., eds. (2003). ZB 2003: Formal Specification and Development in Z and B: Third International Conference of B and Z Users, Turku, Finland, June 4–6, 2003. Springer, Lecture Notes in Computer Science, Volume 2651. 
 Treharne, H.; King, S.; Henson, M.C.; Schneider, S., eds. (2005). ZB 2005: Formal Specification and Development in Z and B: 4th International Conference of B and Z Users, Guildford, UK, April 13–15, 2005. Springer, Lecture Notes in Computer Science, Volume 3455. 

From 2008, the ZB conferences were expanded to be the ABZ conference, also including Abstract State Machines.

Chair and secretary
Successive chairs have been:

 John Nicholls (1992–1994)
 Jonathan Bowen (1994–2011)
 Steve Reeves (2011–)

Successive secretaries have been:

 Mike Hinchey (1994–2011)
 Randolph Johnson (2011–)

See also
 Formal methods

References

External links
Z User Group

1992 establishments in the United Kingdom
Organizations established in 1992
Formal methods organizations
Z notation
User groups
Computer clubs in the United Kingdom